Yonsei University Mirae Campus is Yonsei University's satellite campus. It was established in Wonju, South Korea in 1978.

The campus was created from the merger of Wonju Christian Hospital and Yonsei University. The Wonju Christian Hospital was established from the reconstruction of the Swedish Methodist Hospital which was originally founded by Albin Garfield Anderson.

References

External links 
 Yonsei University Mirae Campus 

Yonsei University
Universities and colleges in Gangwon Province, South Korea
Education in Wonju